Save Me from Myself: How I Found God, Quit Korn, Kicked Drugs, and Lived to Tell My Story is the autobiography of Korn guitarist Brian "Head" Welch. It chronicles his life from childhood, to his days with Korn, his addiction to drugs, his embrace of a life of living for God, and the beginning of his solo career.

In the U.S., the hardcover was published on July 1, 2007, and the paperback on June 24, 2008 (HarperOne). In the U.K., the hardcover was published on July 1, 2007 (HarperOne), and the paperback on July 1, 2008 (HarperSanFrancisco). Save Me from Myself was followed in 2008 by the "clean" reprint Washed by Blood.

Reception
The book premiered at the 25th position on the New York Times Best Seller list. and on July 29, 2007, the book was at number 15 as of that week, being one week on the list.

Chapter listing
 "Author's Note"
 "Prologue"
"Part I: To Hell and Back"
 "Life Begins in Bako"
 "It All Comes Together"
 "The Final Piece"
 "It Starts to Come Apart"
 "Life Changes"
 "I Fall to Pieces"
 "...And Get Put Back Together"
"Part II: Heaven on Earth"
 "I Go Public"
 "Tongues"
 "Head Hunting in India"
 "Into the Desert"
" I Go Through Hell Again"
 "Epilogue"
 "Acknowledgements"

Washed by Blood

Washed by Blood: Lessons from My Time with Korn and My Journey to Christ is the second autobiography of the former Korn guitarist, Brian "Head" Welch. It is a "clean" version of Welch's 2007 memoir, Save Me from Myself, re-adapted without the profanity and gory details of the original story for a younger audience. It is a young adult companion to his bestseller, sharing his inspirational story of rock, addiction and redemption with Christian teens across the US. In the book, Welch discusses his consuming addiction to methamphetamine, and how Christ released him from his drug addiction.

References

External links
 Save Me from Myself page on the HarperCollins website
 Washed by Blood page on the HarperCollins website
 Save Me from Myself from Amazon.com
 Washed by Blood from Amazon.com

2007 non-fiction books
2008 non-fiction books
Music autobiographies
HarperOne books